Following is a list of senators of Hautes-Pyrénées, people who have represented the department of Hautes-Pyrénées in the Senate of France.

Third Republic

Jean Adnet (1876–1882)
Louis Cazalas (1876–1882)
Germain Dupré (1882–1891)
Armand Deffis (1882–1892)
Jean Dupuy (1891–1919)
Gustave Baudens (1893–1900)
Alphonse Pedebidou (1900–1925)
Paul Dupuy (1920–1927)
Louis Noguès (1925–1936)
Manuel Fourcade (1927–1940)
Émile Mireaux (1936–1940)

Fourth Republic 
Paul Baratgin (Gauche démocratique) 1946–1959
Pierre Bourda (Gauche démocratique) 1958–1959
Gaston Manent (Gauche démocratique) 1948–1958

Fifth Republic

Antoine Béguère (Républicains et indépendants) 1959–1960
Paul Baratgin (Gauche démocratique) 1959–1966
Robert Burret (Républicains et indépendants) 1960–1965
 Pierre Bourda (Gauche démocratique) 1965–1974
Pierre Mailhé (Gauche démocratique) 1966–1974
René Billères (Radicaux de gauche) 1974–1983
Hubert Peyou (Rassemblement démocratique et européen) 1974–1992
François Abadie (Rassemblement démocratique et européen) 1983–2001
François Fortassin (European Democratic and Social Rally group) 2001–2017
 Josette Durieu (Socialiste) 2001–2017
 Michel Pélieu (European Democratic and Social Rally group) 2017
 Viviane Artigalas (Socialist Party) from 2017
 Maryse Carrère (European Democratic and Social Rally group) from 2017

References

 
Hautes-Pyrenees